Tibor Nyári (born 11 June 1986 in Győr) is a retired Hungarian football player.

References 

1986 births
Living people
Sportspeople from Győr
Hungarian footballers
Association football midfielders
Győri ETO FC players
Gyirmót FC Győr players
BFC Siófok players
Paksi FC players
Nemzeti Bajnokság I players